George L. Dunlap served as president of the Chicago & North Western Railway and as City Marshall of Chicago.

Biography
Dunlap was born in 1830 in Maine. 

In his career, Dunlap served in various corporate leadership roles at the Chicago & North Western Railway, including general superintendent and president. In late 1869, as president, Dunlap took strong interest in George Westinghouse's railway air brake, inviting him to Chicago to demonstrate the brake to other railroad officials and members of the press. Westinghouse thereafter ran a demonstration trip to Chicago, which helped to advance the adoption of the new technology.

Dunlap was a sailing enthusiast.

From July 30 until November 22, 1875, Dunlap served as City Marshall of Chicago, a newly reconstituted position which served as co-head of the Chicago Police Department alongside the General Superintendent (which was held, coinciding with Dunlap's tenure as Marshall, first by Jacob Rehm until October 4 and thereafter by Michael C. Hickey beginning on October 7). Dunlap had been appointed by mayor Harvey D. Colvin. 

Dunlap married a daughter of John Blake Rice. Dunlap's wife was principally involved in creating the Children's Building annex of The Woman's Building at the 1893 World's Columbian Exposition in Chicago.

Dunlap served as president of the Chicago Belt Company, which in the 1890s had unsuccessfully planned to built a belt rail line around Chicago.

Legacy
Dunlap is the namesake of Dunlap, Iowa.

References

1830 births
1904 deaths
Heads of the Chicago Police Department